Khan Tipu Sultan (13 December 1950 – 19 August 2017) was a Bangladesh Awami League politician and three time Jatiya Sangsad member  from Jessore-5 constituency.

Early life
Sultan was born in Dhamalia, Dumuria Upazila, Khulna District in the then East Bengal, Pakistan. He studied at the Sanmilani Institution in Jessore. He served as the General Secretary of Bangladesh Chhatra League unit of Jessore District.

Career
Sultan was involved in the 1969 student protests. He also led protests against Nurul Amin visiting Jessore. He was sued by the military government of Pakistan and imprisoned. He was released after Sheikh Mujibur Rahman asked General Yahya Khan to release him following the 1970 general elections in Pakistan. He was elected to parliament from Jessore-5 in 1991, 1996, and in 2008 as a Bangladesh Awami League candidate.

Personal life and death
Sultan was married to Prof. Dr. Jesmin Ara Begum and had two sons - Humayun Sultan (Shadab) and Jubaer Sultan (Pelob). In November 2014, Sultan and Jesmin went into hiding after a murder case was filed against them in connection with the death of their daughter-in-law, Shamarukh Mahjabin, in their house in Dhanmondi. According to her husband Humayun, Mahjabin committed suicide. According to the verdict of supreme court of Bangladesh, Humayun Sultan was found NOT guilty after a years of legal battles and political attacks.

Sultan died on 19 August 2017 in Central Hospital in Dhaka. He was buried in Dhamalia.

References

1950 births
2017 deaths
People from Jessore District
Awami League politicians
Mukti Bahini personnel
5th Jatiya Sangsad members
7th Jatiya Sangsad members
9th Jatiya Sangsad members